The 2015 Challenger Ciudad de Guayaquil was a professional tennis tournament played on clay courts. It was the eleventh edition of the tournament which was part of the 2015 ATP Challenger Tour. It took place in Guayaquil, Ecuador between November 2 and November 8, 2015.

Singles main-draw entrants

Seeds

 1 Rankings are as of October 26, 2015.

Other entrants
The following players received wildcards into the singles main draw:
  Iván Endara 
  Gonzalo Escobar 
  Emilio Gómez
  Roberto Quiroz

The following players entered the main draw as alternates:
  Damir Džumhur 
  Juan Carlos Sáez

The following players received entry from the qualifying draw:
  Guido Andreozzi
  Michael Linzer
  Axel Michon
  Thiago Monteiro

Champions

Singles

 Gastão Elias def.  Diego Schwartzman 6–0, 6–4

Doubles

 Guillermo Durán /  Andrés Molteni def.  Gastão Elias /  Fabrício Neis 6–3, 6–4

External links
Official Website

Challenger Ciudad de Guayaquil
Challenger Ciudad de Guayaquil
Tennis tournaments in Ecuador